The 1882 Liverpool by-election was held on 8 December 1882 when the incumbent Conservative MP, Dudley Ryder succeeded to the peerage as Earl of Harrowby.  It was won by the Liberal candidate Samuel Smith.  The constituency was abolished in November 1885, so the gain was not retained.

References

1882 elections in the United Kingdom
Walton, 1882
1882 in England
1880s in Liverpool
December 1882 events